Islamic calligraphy is the artistic practice of handwriting and calligraphy, in the languages which use Arabic alphabet or the alphabets derived from it. It includes Arabic, Persian, Ottoman, and Urdu calligraphy. It is known in Arabic as khatt Arabi, which translates into Arabic line, design, or construction.

The development of Islamic calligraphy is strongly tied to the Qur'an; chapters and excerpts from the Qur'an are a common and almost universal text upon which Islamic calligraphy is based. Although artistic depictions of people and animals are not explicitly forbidden by the Qur'an, pictures have traditionally been limited in Islamic books in order to avoid idolatry. Although some scholars dispute this, Kufic script was supposedly developed around the end of the 7th century in Kufa, Iraq, from which it takes its name. The style later developed into several varieties, including floral, foliated, plaited or interlaced, bordered, and square kufic. In the ancient world, though, artists would often get around this prohibition by using strands of tiny writing to construct lines and images. Calligraphy was a valued art form, even as a moral good. An ancient Arabic proverb illustrates this point by emphatically stating that "Purity of writing is purity of the soul."

However, Islamic calligraphy is not limited to strictly religious subjects, objects, or spaces. Like all Islamic art, it encompasses a diverse array of works created in a wide variety of contexts. The prevalence of calligraphy in Islamic art is not directly related to its non-figural tradition; rather, it reflects the centrality of the notion of writing and written text in Islam. For instance, the Islamic prophet Muhammad is related to have said: "The first thing God created was the pen."

Islamic calligraphy developed from two major styles: Kufic and Naskh. There are several variations of each, as well as regionally specific styles. Arabic or Persian calligraphy has also been incorporated into modern art, beginning with the post-colonial period in the Middle East, as well as the more recent style of calligraffiti.

Instruments and media
The traditional instrument of the Islamic calligrapher is the kalam, a pen normally made of dried reed or bamboo. The ink is often in colour and chosen so that its intensity can vary greatly, creating dynamism and movement in the letter forms. Some styles are often written using a metallic-tip pen.

Islamic calligraphy can be applied to a wide range of decorative mediums other than paper, such as tiles, vessels, carpets, and stone. Before the advent of paper, papyrus and parchment were used for writing. During the 9th century, an influx of paper from China revolutionized calligraphy. While monasteries in Europe treasured a few dozen volumes, libraries in the Muslim world regularly contained hundreds and even thousands of books.

For centuries, the art of writing has fulfilled a central iconographic function in Islamic art. Although the academic tradition of Islamic calligraphy began in Baghdad, the centre of the Islamic empire during much of its early history, it eventually spread as far as India and Spain.

Coins were another support for calligraphy. Beginning in 692, the Islamic caliphate reformed the coinage of the Near East by replacing Byzantine Christian imagery with Islamic phrases inscribed in Arabic. This was especially true for dinars, or gold coins of high value. Generally, the coins were inscribed with quotes from the Qur'an.

By the tenth century, the Persians, who had converted to Islam, began weaving inscriptions onto elaborately patterned silks. So precious were textiles featuring Arabic text that Crusaders brought them to Europe as prized possessions. A notable example is the Suaire de Saint-Josse, used to wrap the bones of St. Josse in the Abbey of St. Josse-sur-Mer, near Caen in north-western France.

As Islamic calligraphy is highly venerated, most works follow examples set by well-established calligraphers, with the exception of secular or contemporary works. In the Islamic tradition, calligraphers underwent extensive training in three stages, including the study of their teacher's models, in order to be granted certification.

Styles

Kufic 

The Kufic style emphasizes rigid and angular strokes, it developed alongside the Naskh script in the 7th century. Although some scholars dispute this, Kufic script was supposedly developed around the end of the 7th century in Kufa, Iraq, from which it takes its name. The style later developed into several varieties, including floral, foliated, plaited or interlaced, bordered, and square kufic. Due to its straight and orderly style of lettering, Kufic was frequently used in ornamental stone carving as well as on coins. It was the main script used to copy the Qur'an from the 8th to 10th century and went out of general use in the 12th century when the flowing naskh style become more practical. However, it continued to be used as a decorative element to contrast superseding styles.

There was no set rules of using the Kufic script; the only common feature is the angular, linear shapes of the characters. Due to the lack of standardization of early Kufic, the script differs widely between regions, ranging from very square and rigid forms to flowery and decorative ones.

Common varieties include square Kufic, a technique known as banna'i. Contemporary calligraphy using this style is also popular in modern decorations.

Decorative Kufic inscriptions are often imitated into pseudo-kufics in Middle age and Renaissance Europe. Pseudo-kufics is especially common in Renaissance depictions of people from the Holy Land. The exact reason for the incorporation of pseudo-Kufic is unclear. It seems that Westerners mistakenly associated 13th-14th century Middle Eastern scripts with systems of writing used during the time of Jesus, and thus found it natural to represent early Christians in association with them.

Naskh

The use of cursive scripts coexisted with Kufic, and historically cursive was commonly used for informal purposes. Naskh first appeared within the first century of the Islamic calendar. Naskh translates to "copying," as it became the standard for transcribing books and manuscripts. The script is the most ubiquitous among other styles, used in the Qur'an, official decrees, and private correspondence. It became the basis of modern Arabic print.

Kufic is commonly believed to predate naskh, but historians have traced the two scripts as coexisting long before their codification by ibn Muqla, as the two served different purposes. Kufi was used primarily in decoration, while Naskh served for everyday scribal use.

Thuluth 
Thuluth was developed during the 15th century and slowly refined by Ottoman Calligraphers including Mustafa Râkim, Shaykh Hamdallah, and others, till it became what it is today. Letters in this script have long vertical lines with broad spacing. The name, meaning "one third", may possibly be a reference to the x-height, which is one-third of the 'alif, or to the fact that the pen used to write the vowels and ornaments is one third the width of that used in writing the letters.

Reqa' 

Reqa' is a handwriting style similar to thuluth. It first appeared in the 10th century. The shape is simple with short strokes and small flourishes. Yaqut al-Musta'simi was one of the calligraphers who employed this style. The Arab, Ibn al-Bawwab is actually believed to have created this script.

Muhaqqaq 

Muhaqqaq is a majestic style used by accomplished calligraphers, and is a variation of thuluth. Along with thuluth, it was considered one of the most beautiful scripts, as well as one of the most difficult to execute. Muhaqqaq was commonly used during the Mamluk era, but its use became largely restricted to short phrases, such as the basmallah, from the 18th century onward.

Regional styles

With the spread of Islam, the Arabic script was established in a vast geographic area with many regions developing their own unique style. From the 14th century onward, other cursive styles began to develop in Turkey, Persia, and China.

 Maghrebi scripts developed from Kufic letters in the Maghreb (North Africa) and al-Andalus (Iberia), Maghrebi scripts are traditionally written with a pointed tip (القلم المذبب), producing a line of even thickness. Within the Maghrebi family, there are different styles including the cursive mujawher and the ceremonial mabsut.
 Sudani scripts developed in Biled as-Sudan (the West African Sahel) and can be considered a subcategory of Maghrebi scripts
 Diwani is a cursive style of Arabic calligraphy developed during the reign of the early Ottoman Turks in the 16th and early 17th centuries. It was invented by Housam Roumi, and reached its height of popularity under Süleyman I the Magnificent (1520–1566). Spaces between letters are often narrow, and lines ascend upwards from right to left. Larger variations called djali are filled with dense decorations of dots and diacritical marks in the space between, giving it a compact appearance. Diwani is difficult to read and write due to its heavy stylization and became the ideal script for writing court documents as it ensured confidentiality and prevented forgery.
 Nasta'liq is a cursive style originally devised to write the Persian language for literary and non-Qur'anic works. Nasta'liq is thought to be a later development of the naskh and the earlier ta'liq script used in Iran. Quite rapidly gaining popularity as a script in South Asia. The name ta'liq means "hanging," and refers to the slightly sloped quality of lines of text in this script. Letters have short vertical strokes with broad and sweeping horizontal strokes. The shapes are deep, hook-like, and have high contrast. A variant called Shikasteh was developed in the 17th century for more formal contexts.
 Sini is a style developed in China. The shape is greatly influenced by Chinese calligraphy, using a horsehair brush instead of the standard reed pen. A famous modern calligrapher in this tradition is Hajji Noor Deen Mi Guangjiang.

Modern
In the post-colonial era, artists working in North Africa and the Middle East transformed Arabic calligraphy into a modern art movement, known as the Hurufiyya movement. Artists working in this style use calligraphy as a graphic element within contemporary artwork.

The term, hurufiyya is derived from the Arabic term, harf for letter. Traditionally, the term was charged with Sufi intellectual and esoteric meaning. It is an explicit reference to a medieval system of teaching involving political theology and lettrism. In this theology, letters were seen as primordial signifiers and manipulators of the cosmos.

Hurufiyya artists blended Western art concepts with an artistic identity and sensibility drawn from their own culture and heritage. These artists integrated Islamic visual traditions, especially calligraphy, and elements of modern art into syncretic contemporary compositions. Although hurufiyyah artists struggled to find their own individual dialogue within the context of nationalism, they also worked towards an aesthetic that transcended national boundaries and represented a broader affiliation with an Islamic identity.

The hurufiyya artistic style as a movement most likely began in North Africa  with the work of Ibrahim el-Salahi. However, the use of calligraphy in modern artworks appears to have emerged independently in various Islamic states. Artists working in this were often unaware of other hurufiyya artists's works, allowing for different manifestations of the style to emerge in different regions. In Sudan, for instance, artworks include both Islamic calligraphy and West African motifs.

The hurufiyya art movement was not confined to painters and included artists working in a variety of media. One example is the Jordanian ceramicist, Mahmoud Taha who combined the traditional aesthetics of calligraphy with skilled craftsmanship. Although not affiliated with the hurufiyya movement, the contemporary artist Shirin Neshat integrates Arabic text into her black-and-white photography, creating contrast and duality. In Iraq, the movement was known as Al Bu'd al Wahad (or the One Dimension Group)", and in Iran, it was known as the Saqqa-Khaneh movement.

Western art has influenced Arabic calligraphy in other ways, with forms such as calligraffiti, which is the use of calligraphy in public art to make politico-social messages or to ornament public buildings and spaces. Notable Islamic calligraffiti artists include: Yazan Halwani active in Lebanon, el Seed working in France and Tunisia, and Caiand A1one in Tehran.

In 2017 the Sultanate of Oman unveiled the Mushaf Muscat, an interactive calligraphic Quran following supervision and support from the Omani Ministry of Endowments and Religious Affairs, a voting member of the Unicode Consortium.

Gallery

Kufic

Naskh and Thuluth

Regional varieties

Modern examples

Craft

List of calligraphers
Some classical calligraphers:

See also

References

External links

 Islamic Calligraphy Pictures
 Mushaf Muscat
 mastersofistanbul.com
 baradariarts.com
 Gallery with much calligraphy in Turkish mosque
Anthology of Persian calligraphers from 10th to 20th centuries

 
Islamic art
Islamic architectural elements
Ottoman culture
Islamic arts of the book
Islamic illuminated manuscripts
Persian calligraphy
Arabic calligraphy
Intangible Cultural Heritage of Humanity